Lego Masters is an international reality television show in which teams compete to build the best Lego project, based on the original British show of that name, which premiered in 2017. Many other countries adapted the format and began airing their own versions starting in 2018. As of 2020, the format is jointly owned by Tuesday's Child, The Lego Group and Banijay.

International versions

Overview 
As of June 2022, 42 winners have been crowned within different versions of Lego Masters.

 Franchise with a currently airing season (3)
 Franchise with an upcoming season (6)
 Franchise with an unknown status (3)
 Franchise awaiting confirmation (0)
 Franchise that has ceased to air (3)

United Kingdom

Germany 
Lego Masters Germany was broadcast by RTL. The first season premiered Sunday 18 November 2018 and ended Sunday 9 December 2018. In each of the four stand-alone episodes, four duos competed. Each episode included two challenges. After the first (unplanned) 2-3 hour challenge, one of the teams dropped out and the other three competed in the second (planned) 6-10 hour challenge for the win in the episode.

The series was presented by German presenter Oliver Geissen. Judges were senior Lego developer Juliane Aufdembrink and design professor Paolo Tumminelli. Every episode another German TV personality announced the challenges and assisted the judges: comedian Lutz van der Horst in episode 1, football personality Reiner Calmund in episodes 2 and 3 and dancer Joachim Llambi in episode 4.

Contestants include notable 'LEGO Community' members such as Christoph  Helfenbein from Lego website www.imperiumdersteine.de, Claus-Marc Hahn from www.brickscreations.com, Johann Irl and Roland Bachmaier from Happy Brixx and father and son Wolfgang and Marcel Diaz from YouTube channel Spacebricks.

In January 2020 the casting for the second season started. It had new judges and a new presenter. There were 4 normal seasons and 2 "Winter champion" seasons.

Australia 

An Australian series was commissioned in July 2018 by the Nine Network, and officially confirmed at Nine’s Upfronts in October 2018, also announcing the series would be hosted by Hamish Blake and judged by Ryan "The Brickman" McNaught. Auditions opened in June 2018, and Season 1 was screened on the Nine network from 28 April to 14 May 2019. Due to the success of the series, In May 2019 the series was renewed for a second season which filmed later in 2019 and set to air in 2020. On 16 October 2019, the second season was officially confirmed at Nine's upfronts. The second season began airing on 19 April 2020 and ended on 18 May 2020.

On 16 September 2020, the series was renewed for a third season which began airing on 19 April 2021 and ended on 17 May 2021. In April 2021, Nine Network renewed the series for a fourth and fifth season with Blake set to return as host for both.

Netherlands and Belgium 
A Dutch version (nl) of Lego Masters with participants from Netherlands and Belgium premiered 11 April 2020 on RTL4 in The Netherlands and on VTM in Belgium.
The series is presented by the Dutch Ruben Nicolai and Belgian Kürt Rogiers (nl). The judge is senior Lego developer Bas Brederode, who is originally from the Netherlands but currently lives in Billund, Denmark with his family.

On 26 December 2020 a stand alone Christmas special was broadcast by RTL4 with teams of Dutch celebrities competing for the title of Lego Masters Kerst as well as to raise money for charity Het Vergeten Kind.

In 2021, a second season aired with senior Lego developer Jonathan Bennink as the new Brickmaster. Both Nikolai and Rogiers returned as hosts.

On 15 May 2021 RTL4 aired another special, this time with teams of kids between 7 and 12 years old trying to win the title of Lego Masters Kids and a year of free Lego from a toy store.

In 2022 a third season aired, with new Brickmaster Esmee Kuenen, Senior Element Designer at Lego, and new hosts: the Dutch Jamai Loman and Belgian Andy Peelman (nl).

New Zealand 
A New Zealand version of the show has aired in 2022 on TVNZ. A second season should air sometime in 2023, TBA.

United States 

An American version of the show is made for Fox. The show premiered February 5, 2020, and is hosted by actor Will Arnett, who also serves as executive producer. The judges, “brickmasters”, were Amy Corbett and Jamie Berard. Contestants include notable 'LEGO Community' members Iceberg Bricks and Boone Langston (from Beyond the Brick), both of whom established a fanbase online prior to being cast in the show. A second season premiered in June 2021. A third season premiered in September 2022.

China 
A Chinese version of the show is set to be produced by Long Qing Media for Shenzhen TV.

France 

A French version of the show started on M6 on December 23, 2020.

Sweden 

A Swedish version of the program was broadcast in 2020 on TV4. A second season started airing in 2021.

Spain 
A Spanish version of the show was produced by Shine Iberia for Atresmedia with host Roberto Leal. It premiered on 15 December 2021, but due to poor ratings in its first two weeks, Antena 3 burned off its last three episodes on 29 December.

Poland 
Polish version of the show, called Lego Masters, started to air in 2020.

Norway 
A Norwegian version of the show, called Lego Masters Norge, started to air on TV 2 on October 15, 2021.

Colombia
A Colombian 2024 version of Lego Masters with participants from Colombia is being prepared by RCN Televisión.

Chile
A Chilean 2024 version of Lego Masters with participants from Chile is being prepared by Canal 13.

Denmark 
A Danish version of Lego Masters was broadcast on TV 2 during spring 2021 with host Victor Lander.
Unlike other editions of the program, the Danish version offered no cash prize. Instead, the three builds from the show’s freestyle finale were exhibited in Lego House, Denmark. And the winners were built and exhibited as miniland figures in Legoland in Billund.

The show featured judge Søren Dyrhøj, a renowned Lego employee famous among Lego enthusiasts for designing several classic Star Wars sets including the Y-wing Star Fighter, The Death Star, and the Millennium Falcon.

Additionally, a 2-episode Christmas and New Year's special featuring five of the participants from season one, each paired with a Danish celebrity, aired in December 2021.

A second season began airing on September 3rd, 2022.

Czech Republic and Slovakia 
A Czech and Slovak version of Lego Masters with participants from the Czech Republic and Slovakia is being prepared by TV Nova and TV Markíza. The show will be aired on June 5, 2022 on the Czech TV Nova and Slovak TV Markíza, and on May 29, 2022 on the Voyo.cz and Voyo.sk VOD platforms.

References

Notes 

Lego television series
Reality television series franchises